Kazaraj (also Romanized as Kaz̄araj) is a village in Kandovan Rural District, Kandovan District, Meyaneh County, East Azerbaijan Province, Iran. At the 2006 census, its population was 291, in 71 families.

References 

Populated places in Meyaneh County